Gamdi is a village in the Ahmedabad District of the Indian state of Gujarat. Nearby villages are Devdi, Geratpur, Ropda, Vinzol and Aslali. Gamdi's Postal Index Number code is 382435 and the postal head office is Nandej.

References

See also 
 Ahmedabad District on Government of Gujarat

Cities and towns in Ahmedabad district